The Diocese of Glasgow can refer to:

Archdiocese of Glasgow, former Roman Catholic Archdiocese in Scotland and after one of the thirteen (after 1633 fourteen) historical dioceses of the Scottish church, one of two archdioceses
Roman Catholic Archdiocese of Glasgow, modern Roman Catholic diocese re-established in 1878, based upon the model of the old diocese, based at St. Andrew's Metropolitan Cathedral
Diocese of Glasgow and Galloway, Scottish episcopal created in the 18th century on the model of two earlier dioceses combined, and based at St. Mary's Cathedral, Glasgow

See also
Presbytery of Glasgow (Church of Scotland)